South Cotabato's at-large congressional district is a defunct congressional district that encompassed the entire province of South Cotabato in the Philippines. It was represented in the House of Representatives from 1967 to 1972 and in the Batasang Pambansa from 1984 to 1986. The province of South Cotabato was created as a result of the partition of Cotabato in 1966 and elected its first representative provincewide at-large during the Philippine House of Representatives special election of November 14, 1967. It covered the combined territories of the present-day South Cotabato and Sarangani provinces including the now-independent city of General Santos. The district remained a single-member district until the dissolution of the lower house in 1972. It was later absorbed by the multi-member Region XI's at-large district for the national parliament in 1978. In 1984, provincial and city representations were restored and South Cotabato elected three members for the regular parliament. The district was abolished following the 1987 reapportionment to establish three districts in the province under a new constitution.

Representation history

See also
Legislative districts of South Cotabato

References

Former congressional districts of the Philippines
Politics of South Cotabato
1966 establishments in the Philippines
1972 disestablishments in the Philippines
1984 establishments in the Philippines
1986 disestablishments in the Philippines
At-large congressional districts of the Philippines
Congressional districts of Soccsksargen
Constituencies established in 1966
Constituencies disestablished in 1972
Constituencies established in 1984
Constituencies established in 1986